Al Ansar Football Club is a football club based in Tariq El Jdideh, a district in Beirut, Lebanon, that competes in the . Formed in 1951, the club did not win its first Lebanese Premier League until 1988. They went on to set a world record by winning the league 11 seasons in a row.

Ansar is the most successful club in the country, having won the Lebanese Premier League 14 times and the Lebanese FA Cup 15 times. Ansar's major rivalry is with Nejmeh; dubbed the Beirut derby, it is the most anticipated game in Lebanon.

While club's support comes in majority from the Sunni Muslim community in Beirut, the club has fans of all faiths from all around the country; they had been funded by Rafic Hariri and Salim Diab until 2005. Nabil Badr has been the club's president and main patron since 2012.

History

Early history 
In 1948, a group of young Beirutis set up the first administrative board at the club headed by Mustafa Al-Shami. Three years Misbah Dougan, then head of the administrative board, formally requested an official licence for the club allowing them to play football on all Lebanese grounds. They were to be called "Al-Intisar", Arabic for "Victory", however a club with that name was already present. Mustafa Al-Shami proposed "Ansar" in remembrance of the supporters of the prophet Muhammad.

Initially, Ansar was known as a Mount Lebanon team, rather than a team from Beirut. This is because, as Beirut had already too many clubs, the Federation decided to relocate Ansar to Ghobeiry. In 1965, Ansar moved to Beirut and won the 1966 Lebanese Second Division promotion play-offs, gaining promotion to the Lebanese Premier League for the following season.

Recent history 
Ansar were crowned champions of the 2020–21 Lebanese Premier League by beating Nejmeh 2–1 in the Beirut derby in the last matchday; they won their 14th title, their first since 2007. They made the season a double, after beating Nejmeh in the Lebanese FA Cup final.

Supporters
Although the club's roots lie in the Sunni community in Beirut, Ansar's support comes from all areas and religions in Lebanon. The club has been associated with the Hariri family from the early 1990s till 2005. In 2018, following the introduction of ultras groups in Lebanon, "Ultras Ansari 18" (UA18) was formed.

Club rivalries

The Beirut derby with Nejmeh has historically been the most anticipated game in Lebanon: both located in Beirut, Nejmeh and Ansar have shared the majority of titles. While Nejmeh has been more successful in Asia, Ansar holds the most league titles and FA Cups.

Another important rivalry is with Ahed: located in Beirut, they are affiliated with Hezbollah, with their fan base mostly coming from the Shia community in Beirut. In addition Ansar has a rivalry with Safa, also based in Beirut.

Players

Current squad

Notable players

Honours
 Lebanese Premier League
 Winners (14; record): 1987–88, 1989–90, 1990–91, 1991–92, 1992–93, 1993–94, 1994–95, 1995–96, 1996–97, 1997–98, 1998–99, 2005–06, 2006–07, 2020–21
 Lebanese FA Cup
Winners (15; record): 1987–88, 1989–90, 1990–91, 1991–92, 1993–94, 1994–95, 1995–96, 1998–99, 2001–02, 2005–06, 2006–07, 2009–10, 2011–12, 2016–17, 2020–21
Runners-up (5): 1985–86, 1996–97, 2000–01, 2018–19, 2021–22
 Lebanese Elite Cup
Winners (2): 1997, 2000
Runners-up (8): 1996, 1998, 2005, 2008, 2010, 2016, 2019, 2022
 Lebanese Federation Cup
 Winners (2; record): 1999, 2000
 Lebanese Super Cup
Winners (6): 1996, 1997, 1998, 1999, 2012, 2021
Runners-up (4): 2002, 2010, 2017, 2019

Performance in AFC competitions

AFC Champions League: 11 appearances
1988–89: Qualifying stage
1989–90: Qualifying stage
1991: Qualifying stage
1993–94: Quarter-finals
1994–95: Quarter-finals
1995: Second round
1997–98: Quarter-finals
1998–99: Second round
1999–2000: Second round
2000–01: First round
2002–03: Qualifying stage

AFC Cup: 8 appearances
2007: Group stage
2008: Group stage
2011: Group stage
2013: Group stage
2018: Group stage
2020: Cancelled
2021: Group stage
2022: Group stage

Asian Cup Winners' Cup: 2 appearances
1991–92: First round
1996–97: First round

Chairmen history
 Mustafa El-Shami (1948–1950)
 Ameen Itani (1950–1954)
 Fouad Rustom (1954–1956)
 Abdul Jalil Al-Sabra (1956–1963)
 Jamil Hasbeeny (1963–1965)
 Abed El-Jamil Ramadan (1965–1967)
 Khaled Kabbani (1967–1975)
 Said Wanid (1975–1977)
 Salim Diab (1977–2008)
 Karim Diab (2008–2012)
 Nabil Badr (2012–present)

See also
 Al Ansar FC (women), defunct women's team
 List of football clubs in Lebanon

Notes

References

External links

 Al Ansar FC at the AFC
 Al Ansar FC at LebanonFG

 
Football clubs in Lebanon
Association football clubs established in 1951
1951 establishments in Lebanon
Sunni Islam in Lebanon